Zapman may refer to:

 Charley Bones (also known as "Zapman"), a fictional character from the television series Mona the Vampire
 Captain Zapman, a character from the movie Oh Shucks! Here Comes UNTAG
 Henry Zapman, a character from the comic strip The Phantom
 Zapman, a superhero that Carl² becomes in the episode "Cloned Crusader" from the television series Carl²
 Zapman, a comic by Jan Bosschaert